Sirje Roops (born 2 October 1992) is an Estonian football manager and former player. She last played as a defender for Naiste Meistriliiga club Tammeka. She represented the Estonia national team from 2014 to 2016.

References

External links

1992 births
Living people
Women's association football defenders
Estonian women's footballers
Estonia women's international footballers
Tartu JK Tammeka (women) players
Estonia women's national football team managers
Estonian football managers